Inauguration of Calvin Coolidge may refer to: 

First inauguration of Calvin Coolidge, 1923
Second inauguration of Calvin Coolidge, 1925